A Tale of Two Critters is a 1977 American adventure documentary film produced by Walt Disney Productions, written and directed by Jack Speirs and released theatrically by Buena Vista Distribution on June 20, 1977.

Premise
A glimpse at the relationship that develops between a young raccoon and a bear cub. As they play together in the splendor of the Pacific Northwest, the two grow into adulthood through a spirited odyssey filled with adventure in the wilds.

Cast
Mayf Nutter as Narrator

Home media
A Tale of Two Critters was released on VHS on October 15, 1981, by Walt Disney Telecommunications and Non-Theatrical Company, under the flagship home video label Walt Disney Home Video.

As of 2014, the film is available as a digital download on Amazon Video, YouTube and iTunes Store.

As of 2020, the film is available to stream on Disney's streaming service, Disney+.

References

External links
 
 
 
 A Tale of Two Critters at Amazon.com
 A Tale of Two Critters on iTunes

1977 films
1977 short films
1977 documentary films
1970s adventure films
American adventure films
American short documentary films
Disney documentary films
Walt Disney Pictures films
Films about bears
Films about raccoons
Films about friendship
Films scored by Buddy Baker (composer)
Disney short films
1970s English-language films
1970s American films
1970s short documentary films